Drosera oreopodion is a species of  sundew and a member of the carnivorous plant family Droseraceae.  It is endemic to Western Australia. It is most noteworthy for being the smallest of all carnivorous plants, with leaves only 5.5 millimeters in length, of which the sticky, circular lamina is only 1.5 mm (about one-eighteenth of an inch). It is a fairly recent discovery, being unknown prior to 1987 when discovered by Allen Lowrie.

References 

oreopodion